Eduardas Kurskis (born 17 October 1976 in Šiauliai) is a retired Lithuanian professional footballer who played as a goalkeeper.

Career
He started his career with Kaunas before leaving for first-team action at hometown Kareda Šiauliai. He returned to Kaunas in 2000, where his performances earned him selection for the Lithuanian national side between 2002 and 2003.

Heart of Midlothian 
Kurskis then joined Scottish club Heart of Midlothian on loan from FBK Kaunas in January 2007, having previously played his entire career in his native country. He made a surprise debut in a 2–1 defeat to Motherwell at Tynecastle on 8 December 2007, despite Hearts first and second choice goalkeepers both being available. He started against Rangers a week later, but he effectively gifted the game to Rangers as he threw the ball over his own goal-line in the 87th minute.

Despite the high-profile blunder against Rangers, Kurskis retained his place for the next game, against Inverness at Tynecastle. He produced another error-ridden performance, culminating in a second booking and a red card for violent conduct. Having made all of their regulation substitutions, Hearts had to place young defender Lee Wallace in goals. Hearts managed to score a penalty to equalise, however Wallace subsequently conceded a winning goal in the 3rd minute of injury time to end the game 3–2 to Inverness.

Kurskis' loan was cancelled on 26 March 2008 and he returned to Kaunas.

See also
FBK Kaunas to Hearts

References

External links
 
 
 Appearances at londonhearts.com
 
 

1976 births
Living people
Sportspeople from Šiauliai
Lithuanian footballers
Association football goalkeepers
Lithuania international footballers
Lithuanian expatriate footballers
Expatriate footballers in Scotland
Expatriate footballers in Belarus
Scottish Premier League players
FK Tauras Tauragė players
FBK Kaunas footballers
FK Kareda Kaunas players
Heart of Midlothian F.C. players
FC Smorgon players
FC Naftan Novopolotsk players
FC Shakhtyor Soligorsk players
FK Klaipėdos Granitas players